Zdeněk Srstka (26 September 1935, Prague – 29 July 2019) was a Czech actor, stuntman and weightlifter. He starred in the film Poslední propadne peklu under director Ludvík Ráža in 1982.

He competed for Czechoslovakia in the 1960 Summer Olympics with the result of ninth place.

References

Czech male film actors
Czech male television actors
1935 births
2019 deaths
Czech male weightlifters
Male actors from Prague
Weightlifters at the 1960 Summer Olympics
Olympic weightlifters of Czechoslovakia